Taiwo Hassan Badmus (born 3 July 1993) is a British/Irish professional basketball player who currently plays for Tindastóll of the Úrvalsdeild karla. He played college basketball in the United States for Fairmont State University and University of Virginia's College at Wise. He is also a member of the Ireland national basketball team and represented them in the FIBA European Championships in the summer of 2018.

College career

Fairmont State 2014–2016 
Two years at Fairmont State, his team went to two NCAA tournaments. Ranked #2 in the country for 10 weeks and ranked top 5 for 16 straight weeks, finished the year as #8 at NABC poll.

Virginia–Wise 2016–2018 
Taiwo Badmus averaged a double double of 22 points and 10.5 rebounds per game for two years in a row at UVa-Wise. He led his team to two conference tournament appearances in his two years there.

College awards 
All Atlantic Region Second Team, All Conference First Team and Virginia Sports Information Directors (VaSID) All-State First Team. He received Conference Player of the week 6 times. Taiwo was also voted as UVa-Wise's Male Athlete of the year his senior year.

Professional career 
After his college career he signed with CB Marín Peixegalego (LEB Plata) in Spain. As a starter, he averaged 13.4 points per game, 7 rebounds per game, and 1.2 steals per game.  He earned MVP of the week once, led his team to and won the playoffs resulting in promotion of his team. He averaged 21.5 points in the playoffs naming him the playoff MVP.

As a starter and the team's leading scorer, Taiwo Badmus averaged 13 points, 6 rebounds, 1 steal and 1 assist per game, playing 23 games with CB Marín Peixegalego (LEB Oro) in Spain, during the 2019-2020 Spain - LEB Gold regular-season. He set his season-high with 25 points in 32 minutes against Real Canoe Madrid on 3 November 2019. He grabbed a season-high 15 rebounds in 33 minutes against Coruña on 1 March 2020. He dished a season-high 2 assists in 33 minutes against Real Canoe Madrid on 6 March 2020. He earned MVP of the week twice this season.

In June 2021, Badmus signed with Tindastóll of the Icelandic Úrvalsdeild karla.

National team career 
From 2018, Badmus is a member of the Ireland National Basketball Team. He participated at the FIBA European Championship for Small Countries 2018 and was one of the best players for Ireland and for the tournament. Badmus led his team to a bronze medal, averaging 14 points, 7 rebounds, 2 steals and 2 blocks per game throughout the tournament, also receiving the MVP Top 5 All-star award of the tournament.

References

External links 
Marin Peixegalego
ESPN profile
FIBA Profile
University of Virginia Wise bio

1993 births
Living people
British Basketball League players
British expatriate basketball people in Spain
British men's basketball players
English expatriates in the United States
Virginia–Wise Cavaliers men's basketball players
Fairmont State Fighting Falcons men's basketball players
Guards (basketball)
Ireland men's national basketball team players
Irish expatriate basketball people in Spain
Irish expatriate basketball people in the United States
British people of Nigerian descent
Expatriate basketball people in Iceland
Taiwo Badmus
Taiwo Badmus